Alexis R. Abramson is an American mechanical engineer and the current dean of the Thayer School of Engineering at Dartmouth College.

Education and career
Abramson earned her BS and MS in mechanical engineering from Tufts University and her PhD in from the University of California, Berkeley.

She joined Thayer School of Engineering (Dartmouth Engineering) in 2019 as its 13th dean, the second woman ever to hold this position in the engineering school's more than 150-year history. Previously, Abramson was the Milton and Tamar Maltz Professor of Energy Innovation at Case Western Reserve University, where she had served on the mechanical and aerospace engineering faculty since 2003. During her time at Case Western Reserve, Abramson served in a variety of leadership roles, including as director of the Case Western Reserve's Great Lakes Energy Institute and as interim chair of the university's electrical engineering and computer science department.

In addition, Abramson has served in a number of roles outside of the university. During President Obama's administration, Abramson was chief scientist and manager of the Emerging Technologies Division at the U.S. Department of Energy's Building Technologies Program, which invests in research, development, and commercialization of energy-efficient and cost-effective building technologies that are within five years of being market-ready. In 2018, she served as a technical adviser for Breakthrough Energy Ventures. From 2006 to 2009, she served as Executive Director of the Nano-Network and Vice President for Technology Innovation at NorTech, where she leveraged technology development and commercialization opportunities at companies and academic institutions in the region.

Abramson is also one of the co-founders of Edifice Analytics, a Cleveland Heights-based company that has developed technology to conduct building energy audits virtually using smart-meter data.

Honors and awards
 Executive Leadership in Academic Technology and Engineering (ELATE) Fellowship (2014)
 Mather Spotlight Prize from Case Western Reserve University (2012)
 National Science Foundation CAREER Award (2005–2010)

References 

Living people
People from Cleveland
Tufts University School of Engineering alumni
UC Berkeley College of Engineering alumni
Thayer School of Engineering faculty
American engineers
Year of birth missing (living people)